"Does to Me" is a song recorded by American country music singers Luke Combs and Eric Church. Co-written by Combs along with Ray Fulcher and Tyler Reeve, it is the third single from Combs's 2019 album What You See Is What You Get.

History
Rolling Stone Country writer Joseph Hudak described the song as featuring "Opening with some clean slide guitar, the mid-tempo ballad calls to mind Bruce Springsteen's wall-of-sound style and progression, with Combs proclaiming his own blue-collar bona fides in the lyrics." Billy Dukes of Taste of Country wrote that "While not his tightest lyric, this song...hits the heart as quick as any of his previous seven No. 1 hits...Most satisfying might be the Gary Morse steel guitar that saturates the mix." Combs wrote the song with Ray Fulcher and Tyler Reeve, and chose to include Church as a duet partner because he thought it fit Church's artistic style along with his own.

Music video
The music video was directed by Jon Small/Trey Fanjoy and premiered on CMT, GAC and Vevo in April 2020.

Commercial performance
"Does to Me" has sold 22,000 copies in the United States as of March 2020.

Charts

Weekly charts

Year-end charts

Certifications

References

2019 songs
2020 singles
Columbia Nashville Records singles
Luke Combs songs
Eric Church songs
Songs written by Luke Combs
Male vocal duets